Spannuth Mill, also known as Crosskill Mill, is a historic grist mill located in Bethel Township in Berks County, Pennsylvania.  The mill was built in 1891. It is a three-story, frame building on a stone foundation measuring 40 feet, 4 inches, by 42 feet, 9 inches, with a 50-foot extension. It has a mansard roof in the Second Empire style.  

Also on the property is a one-story brick building built about 1910.  It once housed a boiler. The mill ceased operations in 1982.

It was listed on the National Register of Historic Places in 1990.

References

Grinding mills on the National Register of Historic Places in Pennsylvania
Second Empire architecture in Pennsylvania
Industrial buildings completed in 1891
Grinding mills in Berks County, Pennsylvania
National Register of Historic Places in Berks County, Pennsylvania